is a Japanese actress. She won the award for best actress at the 25th Hochi Film Award and at the 22nd Yokohama Film Festival  for Face.

Filmography

Film
 Zatoichi and the Chess Expert (1965)
 Face (2000)
 Godzilla Against Mechagodzilla (2002)
 Get Up! (2003)
 Three for the Road (2007)
 Danchi (2016)

Television
 Hissatsu Watashinin (1983)
 Imo Tako Nankin (2006–07)

Honours 
Medal with Purple Ribbon (2020)
Osaka Culture Prize Cultural Transmission Prize (2007)

References

1958 births
Japanese actresses
Living people
Place of birth missing (living people)
Asadora lead actors
Recipients of the Medal with Purple Ribbon